Chicago 'n All That Jazz (subtitled Big Band Jazz of the Broadway Musical) is an album by American jazz saxophonist Lee Konitz performing John Kander and Fred Ebb's songs from the Broadway musical Chicago recorded in 1975 and released on the Groove Merchant label.

Critical reception

Scott Yanow of Allmusic said " Konitz and his sidemen play with enthusiasm and melodic creativity; some of the themes are quite catchy. The playing time (around 36 minutes) is quite brief and the music is far from essential but the performances are surprisingly pleasing, making this a worthy purchase".

Track listing 
All compositions by John Kander and Fred Ebb.
 "Funny Honey" – 5:03
 "My Own Best Friend" – 3:55
 "Ten Percent" – 4:36
 "Loopin' de Loop" – 3:59
 "Razzle Dazzle" – 4:09
 "Me and My Baby" – 5:20
 "Roxie" – 3:30
 "Class" – 5:51

Personnel 
Lee Konitz – alto saxophone, soprano saxophone
Lloyd Michels, Richard Hurwitz – trumpet
Barry Mour – trombone
Alan Raph – trombone
Joe Farrell – tenor saxophone
Don Palmer – tenor saxophone
Dick Katz – piano, electric piano
Mike Longo – electric piano, synthesizer
George Davis – guitar
Major Holly – bass, vocals
Eddie Locke – drums
Ray Armando – percussion

References 

Lee Konitz albums
1975 albums
Groove Merchant albums
Albums produced by Sonny Lester